Tonengo is a comune (municipality) in the Province of Asti in the Italian region Piedmont, located about  east of Turin and about  northwest of Asti.

Tonengo borders the following municipalities: Aramengo, Casalborgone, Cavagnolo, Cocconato, Lauriano, and Moransengo.

References

Cities and towns in Piedmont